Stadion Balgarska Armia is the club stadium of the Bulgarian football club CSKA Sofia. It's situated in the Borisova gradina in the centre of Sofia. The stadium has four sectors and a total of 22,995 (18,495) seats, of which 2,100 are covered. The pitch length is 106 meters and the width is 66 meters.

The capacity of the stadium is divided in four sectors:
Sector A: 6417 seats
Sector B: 4889 seats
Sector V: 5689 seats
Sector G: 6000 (1500 seats)

The sports complex also includes tennis courts, a basketball court, and gymnastics facilities, as well the CSKA Sofia Glory Museum. The press conference room has 80 seats.

History

Built in 1923 for AS-23, the stadium was known as Athletic Park until 1944, when AS-23 merged with two other clubs to form Chavdar Sofia. From 1944 until 1948 it was called Chavdar Stadium. Between 1948 and 1990 it was the People's Army Stadium, and since 1990 it is the Balgarska Armia Stadium. The current structure was built by architect Anton Karavelov in the period between 1965 and 1967 on the old grounds of AS-23. It was reconstructed again in 1982, which included the introduction of floodlights.

In 2000, the stadium was equipped with a new Dynacord surround sound system, capable of 48 kilowatts and 107 decibels. The electric lighting is also of the latest generation and is covering the pitch with 2100 lux. 

Despite the improvements over the years, parts of the stadium are in a deteriorating condition, especially sector B, which has been completely closed down for spectators and covered with advertising instead, in order to hide the growing plant and fungi life underneath. The seating of the stadium is also in a poor condition, with many seats being either partially broken or missing completely, with the main cause being hooliganism over the years.

References

PFC CSKA Sofia
Football venues in Bulgaria
Sports venues in Sofia